The following lists events that happened during 2014 in Mongolia.

Incumbents
President: Tsakhiagiin Elbegdorj
Prime Minister: Norovyn Altankhuyag (until 21 November), Chimediin Saikhanbileg (starting 21 November)

Events

April
 April 3 - A Mongolian-flagged cargo ship sinks off the coast of South Korea, with most of the 16 North Korean crew members reported missing.

References

 
Years of the 21st century in Mongolia
2010s in Mongolia
Mongolia
Mongolia